The 1981 Torneo Descentralizado was the sixty-fifth season of Peruvian football. A total of 16 teams competed in the tournament. The season was divided into two phases. Melgar won its first national title and become the first club outside the Lima Region to win the title.

Format
The national league was divided into two phases. The first phase divided the sixteen teams into groups. Each team was placed into one of four groups depending on the region where the club was located. This dubbed regional tournament was contested in this season because the Peru national football team was using domestic players in preparation for the 1982 World Cup Qualifiers. In order to reduce the impact of the absence of these key players in the national league, the regional tournament was played in which the winner contested the second berth to the 1982 Copa Libertadores against the Descentralizado runner-up. The second phase of the league was the Descentralizado in which all sixteen teams competed in a single league table and its winner was crowned national champion while its runner-up faced the first phase winner for the second berth of the Copa Libertadores.

Teams

Torneo Regional
The Torneo Regional was divided into 4 groups. The groups of the North, South and Central had its group winners advance to a Provincial final group where the top two advanced to the semifinals of the regional tournament. In the Metropolitan group, the top two advanced directly to the semifinals.

Group stage
The North, Central, and South followed these rules:
2 points were given for a win;
1 point for a draw;
No points for a loss.

North group

Central group

South group

Metropolitan group
This group had special rules. Matches ending in draws were decided by a penalty shootout.
3 points were given for a win;
2 points were given for a win after a penalty shootout;
1 point for a draw;
No points for a loss or loss after a penalty shootout.
In addition, the top two of this group advanced to the semifinals.

 Alianza Lima did not advance to the semifinals due to a parallel reserve tournament that was favorable to Universitario (champion) and Deportivo Municipal (runner-up).

Provincial Final

Knockout phase

No winner in finals after two matches. Play-off was contested to determine winner.

Play-off

Torneo Descentralizado

Copa Libertadores play-off

No winner after two matches. Play-off was contested to determine winner.

External links
RSSSF Peru 1981

Peru
Football (soccer)
Peruvian Primera División seasons